is a private Catholic liberal arts women's college in Shinagawa, Tokyo, Japan.

History 
The predecessor of the school, was founded in 1938 by the Handmaids of the Sacred Heart of Jesus. It was chartered as a women's four-year college in 1950.

Organization

Undergraduate studies 
 Department of Spanish Language and Literature
 Department of English Language and Literature
 Department of Global Citizenship Studies
 Department of Cultural History
 Department of Japanese Language and Literature

Graduate School of Humanities 
 Master's Program in Language and Culture
 Master's Program in Thought and Culture
 Master's Program in Global Citizenship Studies
 Doctoral Program in Humanities

Research institutes 
 Research Institute for Cultural Studies
 Research Institute for Christian Culture
 Research Institute for Language Education

Campus

Address 
3-16-21 Higashi Gotanda, Shinagawa-ku, Tokyo, 141-8642, Japan

Facilities 
The university's Italian Renaissance style main building designed by Josiah Conder was built as Prince Shimazu Tadashige's mansion in 1917.

External links
 Official website

References 

Educational institutions established in 1938
Private universities and colleges in Japan
Catholic universities and colleges in Japan
Universities and colleges in Tokyo
Christianity in Tokyo
1938 establishments in Japan
Women's universities and colleges in Japan